Ryonggang station is a railway station in Ryonggang-ŭp, Ryonggang county, South P'yŏngan province, North Korea. It is the junction of the P'yŏngnam and Ryonggang lines of the Korean State Railway.

Originally called Chinjidong station and later renamed Ryonggang station, it was opened by the Chosen Government Railway, along with the rest of the mainline of the P'yŏngnam Line, on 16 October 1910.

References

Railway stations in North Korea
Railway stations opened in 1910